The peninsula least gecko (Sphaerodactylus clenchi)  is a species of lizard in the family Sphaerodactylidae. The species is endemic to the Dominican Republic.

Etymology
The specific name, clenchi, is in honor of American malacologist William James "Bill" Clench, who collected the holotype.

Habitat

Reproduction
S. clenchi is oviparous.

Subspecies
Two subspecies are recognized as being valid, including the nominotypical subspecies.
Sphaerodactylus clenchi apocoptus 
Sphaerodactylus clenchi clench

References

Further reading
Schwartz A (1983). "Part 1. Sphaerodactylus difficilis, S. clenchi, and S. lazelli ". pp. 5–30. In: Schwartz A, Thomas R (1983). "The difficilis complex of Sphaerodactylus (Sauria, Gekkonidae) of Hispaniola". Bulletin of Carnegie Museum of Natural History (22): 1-60. (Sphaerodactylus clenchi apocoptus, new subspecies).
Schwartz A, Henderson RW (1991). Amphibians and Reptiles of the West Indies: Descriptions, Distributions, and Natural History. Gainesville, Florida: University of Florida Press. 720 pp. . (Sphaerodactylus clenchi, p. 478).
Schwartz A, Thomas R (1975). A Check-list of West Indian Amphibians and Reptiles. Carnegie Museum of Natural History Special Publication No. 1. Pittsburgh, Pennsylvania: Carnegie Museum of Natural History. 216 pp. (Sphaerodactylus clenchi, p. 146).
Shreve B (1968). "The notatus group of Sphaerodactylus (Sauria, Gekkonidae) in Hispaniola". Breviora (280): 1-28. (Sphaerodactylus clenchi, new species, pp. 21–23).

Sphaerodactylus
Reptiles of the Dominican Republic
Endemic fauna of the Dominican Republic
Reptiles described in 1968
Taxa named by Benjamin Shreve